The 2019 Rugby Europe Sevens Trophy is the second division of Rugby Europe's 2019 sevens season. This edition was hosted by the cities of Zagreb and Zenica on 15–23 June. The highest-placed teams are promoted to the 2021 Grand Prix, and will join the runner-up to compete in the European Olympic qualifying tournament. The two teams with the fewest points are relegated to the 2021 Conference.
The winner was Lithuania.

Schedule

Standings

Zagreb

All times in Central European Summer Time (UTC+02:00)

Pool Stage

Pool A

Pool B

Pool C

Knockout stage

9th Place

5th Place

Cup

Zenica

All times in Central European Summer Time (UTC+02:00)

Pool Stage

Pool A

Pool B

Pool C

Knockout stage

9th Place

5th Place

Cup

External links
 Tournament page

References

2019 rugby sevens competitions
2019 in Croatian sport
rugby union
Sport in Zagreb
Sport in Zenica
June 2019 sports events in Europe